Joselito Rodríguez (1907–1985) was a Mexican screenwriter and film director.

Selected filmography

Director
 The Priest's Secret (1941)
 Angelitos negros (1948)
 When Children Sin (1952)
 Black Skull (1960)
 Angelitos negros (1970)

Screenwriter
 My General's Women (1951)

References

Bibliography
 Daniel Biltereyst &  Daniela Treveri Gennari. Moralizing Cinema: Film, Catholicism, and Power. Routledge, 2014.

External links

1907 births
1985 deaths
Mexican film producers
Writers from Mexico City
Film directors from Mexico City
20th-century Mexican screenwriters
20th-century Mexican male writers